This page shows the results of the 2001 Men's Central American and Caribbean Basketball Championship, also known as the 2001 Centrobasket, which was held in the city of Toluca, Mexico from July 11 to July 15, 2001. The top four teams qualified for the 2001 Pan American Tournament, scheduled for August 16 to August 27 in Neuquén, Argentina.

Competing nations

Preliminary round

2001-07-11

2001-07-12

2001-07-13

 

2001-07-11

2001-07-12

2001-07-13

Consolidation Round
2001-07-14 — 5th/8th place

2001-07-14 — 1st/4th place

Final round
2001-07-15 — 7th/8th place

2001-07-15 — 5th/6th place

2001-07-15 — 3rd/4th place

2001-07-15 — 1st/2nd place

Final ranking

1. 

2. 

3. 

4. 

5. 

6. 

7. 

8.

References
LatinBasket
Results

Centrobasket
2001–02 in North American basketball
2001 in Central American sport
2001 in Caribbean sport
2001 in Mexican sports
International basketball competitions hosted by Mexico